Thomas Johanson (born 3 June 1969 in Helsinki) is a Finnish sailor and Olympic champion. He won a gold medal in the 49er Class with Jyrki Järvi at the 2000 Summer Olympics in Sydney.
In 2008–2009, he was a crew member on yacht Ericsson 3 and in 2011–12 on yacht PUMA Ocean Racing in the Volvo Ocean Race.

Results
1983 25th, Optimist World Championship. Rio de Janeiro
1984 4th, Optimist World Championship. Kingston, Canada
1986-1990 Top six in every International Europe dinghy regatta.
1991 1st, Open European Championship, Laser class. El Masnou, Spain
1992 1st, Open European Championship, Laser class. Mariestad, Sweden
1993 1st, World Championship, Laser class. Takapuna, New Zealand
1994 4th, World Championship, Laser class. Japan
1996 8th, Olympic Games, Laser class. Atlanta
1999 3rd, 49er World Championship. Chile
2000 1st, Olympic Games, 49er class. Sydney
2004 8th, Olympic Games, 49er class. Athens

References

External links

1969 births
Living people
49er class world champions
Laser class world champions
Finnish male sailors (sport)
Sailors at the 1996 Summer Olympics – Laser
Sailors at the 2000 Summer Olympics – 49er
Sailors at the 2004 Summer Olympics – 49er
Olympic sailors of Finland
Olympic gold medalists for Finland
Swedish-speaking Finns
Sportspeople from Helsinki
Olympic medalists in sailing
Medalists at the 2000 Summer Olympics
Volvo Ocean Race sailors
World champions in sailing for Finland